Khaneqah-e Bafrajerd (also Romanized as Khāneqāh-e Bafrājerd and  Khāneqāh Bafrājerd; also known as Hanaga and Khanaga) is a village in Khanandabil-e Sharqi Rural District, in the Central District of Khalkhal County, Ardabil Province, Iran. At the 2006 census, its population was 893, in 196 families.

References 

Tageo

Towns and villages in Khalkhal County